The Bank of Washington is a historic building in Greenville, Mississippi, USA.

Location
The building is located at 120 South Poplar Street in Downtown Greenville, the county seat of Washington County, Mississippi, in the Southern United States.

History
The two-storey building was completed in 1903. It was designed in the Beaux-Arts architectural style. It was home to the Bank of Washington from 1903 to 1914.

Later, it was home to a cotton brokerage firm and a radio. It has been home to offices since 1974.

Architectural significance
It has been listed on the National Register of Historic Places since July 16, 1987.

References

Greenville, Mississippi
Commercial buildings completed in 1903
Beaux-Arts architecture in Mississippi
Bank buildings on the National Register of Historic Places in Mississippi
National Register of Historic Places in Washington County, Mississippi